Cortistatin can refer to:

Cortistatin (neuropeptide), a peptide hormone
Cortistatins, a class of steroids applied against angiogenesis